Gerald William Riggall "Bill" Patterson (30 August 1923 – 10 January 2010) was an Australian motor racing driver, race team owner and businessman.

Patterson, son of Wimbledon champion Gerald Patterson, attended his father's school, Scotch College, Melbourne, from 1931 to 1934, and Geelong Grammar School from 1935 to 1941. He was one of a brace of new drivers that emerged after World War II, first appearing in the Australian Grand Prix in 1948 driving a stripped down MG TC. After improving the MG as far as he was able, he moved to a JAP powered Cooper Mk.V in 1953. Patterson used this to win his first national title, the 1954 Australian Hillclimb Championship.

In the scorching heat of a Western Australian summer in 1957, Patterson stepped into Lex Davison's Ferrari 625 F1 as a relief driver, working together to defeat Stan Jones to win the 1957 Australian Grand Prix.

A succession of grand prix Coopers followed. The biggest year of Patterson's career was 1961. Victories at Mount Panorama, Lowood, Caversham and a second at Longford saw Patterson dominate the 1961 Australian Drivers' Championship, scoring 51 points to Lex Davison's 15 to win the Gold Star.

Patterson raced on for a few more years and took part in the inaugural Tasman Series in 1964, but after that Patterson stepped away from the sport as a driver, but stayed as an entrant, sponsor and team boss. Patterson Holden dealership Bill Patterson Motors supported several drivers over the following decades, open wheelers for the rest of the 1960s and on into the 1970s. In 1977 Patterson purchased touring car racing team, Team Brock which he ran for a year. Patterson's name continued to be seen in the sport into the 2000s in Speedway racing.

Patterson died at Sandringham on 10 January 2010 at the age of 86.

Career results

References

1923 births
2010 deaths
Racing drivers from Melbourne
Tasman Series drivers
People educated at Geelong Grammar School
People educated at Scotch College, Melbourne